Ipimorpha nanaimo is a species of cutworm or dart moth in the family Noctuidae. It was first described by William Barnes in 1905 and it is found in North America.

The MONA or Hodges number for Ipimorpha nanaimo is 9552.

References

Further reading

 
 
 

Xylenini
Articles created by Qbugbot
Moths described in 1905